Eastern Armenian is one of the two standardized forms of Modern Armenian, the other being Western Armenian. The two standards form a pluricentric language.

Eastern Armenian is spoken in Armenia, Artsakh, Russia, as well as Georgia, and by the Armenian community in Iran. Although the Eastern Armenian spoken by Armenians in Armenia and Iranian-Armenians are similar, there are pronunciation differences with different inflections. Armenians from Iran also have some words that are unique to them. Due to migrations of speakers from Armenia and Iran to the Armenian diaspora, the dialect is now very prominent in countries and regions where only Western Armenian was used. Eastern Armenian is based on the Yerevan dialect.

Official status and recognition 

Eastern Armenian is, for the most part, mutually intelligible by educated or literate users of Western Armenian – and vice versa. Conversely, semi-literate or illiterate users of lower registers of either variety may have difficulty understanding the other.

The official language, according to law, of Armenia is an unspecified "Armenian". In practice, however, Eastern Armenian is the de facto, day-to-day common language of Armenia. For example, commercial translations are generally completed in Eastern Armenian.
 
Until 2018, both varieties shared the same ISO 639-3 code: hye. However, on 23 January 2018, a code specifically for Western Armenian was added to ISO 639-3: hyw. (The previous code under ISO 639-1 was hy.)

The Armenian Wikipedia is predominantly composed of Eastern Armenian content.  As a result of the amendment to ISO 639-3, a campaign to create a separate Wikipedia for Western Armenian has been approved.  This has resulted in separate Wikipedia sites for Eastern Armenian and Western Armenian.

Phonology

Vowels

Monophthongs
Eastern Armenian has six monophthong vowel sounds.

Consonants
This is the Eastern Armenian Consonantal System using symbols from the International Phonetic Alphabet (IPA), followed by the corresponding Armenian letter in parentheses.

{| class="wikitable"
! colspan=2 |  
!Bilabial
!Labiodental
!Alveolar
!Post-alveolar
!Palatal
!Velar
!Uvular
!Glottal
|-
! colspan=2 | Nasal
| class="nounderlines" style="text-align:center;"|   (մ)
|  
| class="nounderlines" style="text-align:center;" |   (ն)
|  
|  
| ⟨ŋ⟩
|  
|  
|-
! rowspan=3 | Stop
! aspirated
| class="nounderlines" style="text-align:center;"|   (փ)
|  
| class="nounderlines" style="text-align:center;" |   (թ)
|  
|  
| class="nounderlines" style="text-align:center;"|   (ք)
|  
|  
|-
! voiceless<ref name=noejectives>“In some publications, the voiceless plosives are also defined as ejectives or glottalised. Glottalised plosives occur in various Armenian dialects and can also be found in the Eastern Armenian vernacular based on the Yerevan dialect, but according to normative grammars, SMEA [Standard Modern Eastern Armenian] shows no glottalised voiceless plosives.” Jasmine Dum-Tragut. Armenian: Modern Eastern Armenian. London Oriental and African Language Library, 2007, ; p. 17</ref>
| class="nounderlines" style="text-align:center;"|   (պ)
|  
| class="nounderlines" style="text-align:center;" |    (տ)
|  
|  
| class="nounderlines" style="text-align:center;"|   (կ)
|  
|  
|-
!voiced
| class="nounderlines" style="text-align:center;"|   (բ)
|  
| class="nounderlines" style="text-align:center;"|   (դ)
|  
|  
| class="nounderlines" style="text-align:center;"|   (գ)
|  
|  
|-
! rowspan=3|Affricate
!aspirated
|  
|  
| class="nounderlines" style="text-align:center;"|   (ց)
| class="nounderlines" style="text-align:center;"|   (չ)
|  
|  
|  
|  
|-
!voiceless
|  
|  
| class="nounderlines" style="text-align:center;"|   (ծ)
| class="nounderlines" style="text-align:center;"|   (ճ)
|  
|  
|  
|  
|-
!voiced
|  
|  
| class="nounderlines" style="text-align:center;"|   (ձ)
| class="nounderlines" style="text-align:center;"|   (ջ)
|  
|  
|  
|  
|-
! rowspan=2|Fricative
!voiceless
|  
| class="nounderlines" style="text-align:center;"|   (ֆ)
| class="nounderlines" style="text-align:center;"|   (ս)
| class="nounderlines" style="text-align:center;"|   (շ)
|  
|  
| class="nounderlines" style="text-align:center;"|   (խ)
| class="nounderlines" style="text-align:center;"|   (հ, յ)
|-
!voiced
|  
| class="nounderlines" style="text-align:center;"|   (վ, ւ, ու, ո)
| class="nounderlines" style="text-align:center;"|   (զ)
| class="nounderlines" style="text-align:center;"|   (ժ)
|  
|  
| class="nounderlines" style="text-align:center;"|   (ղ)
|  
|-
! colspan=2|Approximant
|  
| ⟨ʋ⟩
| rowspan=2 align=center|~   (ր)
|  
| class="nounderlines" style="text-align:center;"|   (յ, ե, ի, է)
|  
|  
|  
|-
! colspan=2|Tap
|  
|  
|  
|  
|  
|  
|  
|-
! colspan=2|Trill
|  
|  
| class="nounderlines" style="text-align:center;" |   (ռ)
|  
|  
|  
|  
|  
|-
! colspan=2|Lateral
|  
|  
| class="nounderlines" style="text-align:center;" |   (լ)
|  
|  
|  
|  
|  
|}
Some of the dialects may release the voiceless stops and affricates as ejectives.

Notes

The phonology of Eastern Armenian preserves the Classical Armenian three-way distinction in stops and affricates: one voiced, one voiceless and one aspirated.  Compare this to the phonology of the Western Armenian language, which has kept only a two-way distinction: one voiced and one aspirated.  (See the Differences in Phonology from Classical Armenian in the Western Armenian language article for details.)

A few exceptional Eastern Armenian words contain voiced stop letters pronounced as voiceless aspirated stops, like Western Armenian.

 Orthography 
The Eastern Armenian language is written using either Traditional Armenian Orthography or Reformed Armenian Orthography. The controversial reformed orthography was developed during the 1920s in Soviet Armenia and is in widespread use today by Eastern Armenian speakers in Armenia and those in the diaspora that are from Armenia. Eastern Armenian speakers in Iran continue to use the traditional orthography. Nevertheless, writings of either form are mutually intelligible, since the difference between the two orthographies is not large.

Morphology

Pronouns

Nouns
Eastern Armenian nouns have seven cases, one more than Western Armenian. They are: nominative (subject), accusative (direct object), genitive (possession), dative (indirect object), ablative (origin), instrumental (means) and locative (position). Of the seven cases, the nominative and accusative, with exceptions, are the same, and the genitive and dative are the same, meaning that nouns have mostly five distinct forms for case. Nouns in Armenian also decline for number (singular and plural), but do not decline for gender (i.e. masculine or feminine).

Declension in Armenian is based on how the genitive is formed. There are several declensions, but two are the most used (genitive in i, and genitive in u):

Two notes:

Abl.sg WA karê/EA 

Second, notice that in Western Armenian, the plural forms followed the u-declension, while in Eastern Armenian the plural forms follow the i-declension:

Gen.pl WA karineru/EA 

Articles
Like some other languages such as English, Armenian has definite and indefinite articles.

 ('a book', Nom.sg),  ('of a book', Gen.sg)

 ('the man', Nom.sg)
 ('the barley' Nom.sg)
but:
 ('This is the man')
 ('This is the barley')

Adjectives
Adjectives in Armenian do not decline for case or number, and precede the noun:

 ('the good book', Nom.sg)
 ('of the good book', Gen.sg)

Verbs
Verbs in Armenian are based on two basic series of forms, a "present" form and an "imperfect" form.  From this, all other tenses and moods are formed with various particles and constructions.  There is a third form, the preterite, which in Armenian is a tense in its own right, and takes no other particles or constructions.  (See also Armenian verbs and Eastern Armenian verb table for more detailed information.)

The present tense in Eastern Armenian is based on two conjugations (a, e).  In Eastern Armenian, the distinct conjugations in e and i merged as e.

The present tense (as we know it in English) is made by adding the present tense of linel after the present participle form of the verb:

 (I am reading the book)
 (I love that book)

See also
 Armenian language
 Armenian verbs
 Eastern Armenian verb table
 Western Armenian language
 Western Armenia
 Eastern Armenia
 Language families and languages
 IETF language tag:hy

References

Bibliography

 Dora Sakayan. (2007) Eastern Armenian for the English-speaking World. A Contrastive Approach (with CD-ROM)''. Yerevan State University Press.

External links
 Arak29 Eastern Armenian
 Arak29 Western Armenian
 Arak29 On-Line Dictionaries

Eastern Armenian Online Dictionaries
 Nayiri.com (Library of Armenian dictionaries):
 Armenian Explanatory Dictionary (ՀԱՅԵՐԷՆ ԲԱՑԱՏՐԱԿԱՆ ԲԱՌԱՐԱՆ) by Stepan Malkhasiants (about 130,000 entries).  Written in traditional Armenian orthography.  One of the definitive Armenian dictionaries.
 Explanatory Dictionary of Contemporary Armenian (ԺԱՄԱՆԱԿԱԿԻՑ ՀԱՅՈՑ ԼԵԶՎԻ ԲԱՑԱՏՐԱԿԱՆ ԲԱՌԱՐԱՆ) published by the Armenian SSR Academy of Sciences between 1969 and 1980. In Eastern Armenian, reformed orthography (about 125,000 headwords).
 Modern Armenian Explanatory Dictionary (ԱՐԴԻ ՀԱՅԵՐԵՆԻ ԲԱՑԱՏՐԱԿԱՆ ԲԱՌԱՐԱՆ) by Edward Aghayan (about 135,600 headwords).  In Eastern Armenian and Soviet Armenian orthography.
 Armenian Language Thesaurus (ՀԱՅՈՑ ԼԵԶՎԻ ՀՈՄԱՆԻՇՆԵՐԻ ԲԱՌԱՐԱՆ) by Ashot Sukiasyan (about 83,000 entries).  In Eastern Armenian and Soviet Armenian orthography.

Armenian languages
Languages of Armenia
Languages of Azerbaijan
Languages of Georgia (country)
Languages of Iran
Languages of Russia